The Institute for Collaborative Biotechnologies (ICB) is a University Affiliated Research Center (UARC) primarily funded by the United States Army. Headquartered at the University of California, Santa Barbara (UCSB) and in collaboration with MIT, Caltech and industry partners, ICB's interdisciplinary approach to research aims to enhance military technology by transforming biological systems into technological applications.

Founding 

UARC proposed the ICB's development in January 2003 and the institute came to fruition by August 22, 2003 with the US Army's announcement to grant $50 million for military research. Since that time, the ICB has remained intact and expanded to include 60 faculty members and 150 researchers that have completed over 135 research projects.

Research 

The ICB's research aim is to model biological mechanisms for use in military materials and tools. Quoting Army Research Office program manager Robert Campbell, "The inspiration for the ICB comes from the fact that biology uses different mechanisms to produce materials and integrated circuits for high-performance sensing, computing and information processing, and actuation than are presently used in human manufacturing." Much research is focused on evaluating biomolecular sensors, bio-inspired materials and energy, biodiscovery tools, bio-inspired network science, and cognitive neuroscience through the disciplines of cellular and molecular biology, materials science, chemical engineering, mechanical engineering, and psychology.

Leadership

Present 

Francis J. Doyle III, ICB Director

Scott Grafton, ICB Associate Director

David Gay, ICB Director of Technology

Robert Kokoska, ICB Army Program Manager

Past 

Daniel Morse, Founding Director

Affiliates 

The ICB is affiliated with the following:

Army Partners 

Aviation & Missile Research, Development & Engineering Center (AMRDEC)
Army Research Laboratory (ARL)
Army Research Office (ARO)
Communication-Electronics Research Development & Engineering Center (CERDEC)
Edgewood Chemical Biological Center (ECBC)
Engineer Research & Development Center (ERDC)
Medical Research & Materiel Command (MRMC)
Natick Soldier Research, Development & Engineering Center (NSRDEC)
Tank Automotive Research, Development & Engineering Center (TARDEC)
Training and Doctrine Command (TRADOC ARCIC)

Industry Partners 

The Aerospace Corporation
Cynvenio Biosystems, LLC
CytomX, Inc.
General Atomics
Innovative Micro Technologies
Integrated Diagnostics
Lockheed Martin
Raytheon Vision Systems
SAIC
Sirigen
Spectrafluidics
Teledyne Scientific Company
Toyon Research Corporation
United Technologies Research Center

Controversy 

In 2008, S.B. Antiwar protested ICB's annual military conference by blocking UCSB's Pardall Tunnel, the main path and bikeway between the campus and city of Isla Vista. Between 200 and 300 students and community members participated and a total of three arrests were made. The conference area was then secured by campus police and the event continued as planned.  The ICB has continued to hold conferences at UCSB each year without incident.

References 

Biotechnology organizations
University of California, Santa Barbara
2003 establishments in the United States
2003 establishments in California
Organizations established in 2003